8/21/00 – Columbus, Ohio is a two-disc live album and the thirty-eighth in a series of 72 live bootlegs released by the American alternative rock band Pearl Jam from the band's 2000 Binaural Tour. It was released along with the other official bootlegs from the first North American leg of the tour on February 27, 2001.

Overview
The album was recorded on August 21, 2000 in Columbus, Ohio at Polaris Amphitheater. It was selected by the band as one of 18 "Ape/Man" shows from the tour, which, according to bassist Jeff Ament, were shows the band found "really exciting." Allmusic gave it one and a half out of a possible five stars. Allmusic staff writer Zac Johnson said, "When undertaking a project of this magnitude, there are bound to be 'off' nights in amongst the remarkable shows, and, unfortunately, this seems to be one of them."

Track listing

Disc one
"Breakerfall" (Eddie Vedder) – 3:41
"Whipping" (Dave Abbruzzese, Jeff Ament, Stone Gossard, Mike McCready, Vedder) – 2:35
"Spin the Black Circle" (Abbruzzese, Ament, Gossard, McCready, Vedder) – 2:47
"Hail, Hail" (Gossard, Vedder, Ament, McCready) – 3:13
"Corduroy" (Abbruzzese, Ament, Gossard, McCready, Vedder) – 4:24
"In My Tree" (Gossard, Jack Irons, Vedder) – 4:30
"Dissident" (Abbruzzese, Ament, Gossard, McCready, Vedder) – 3:35
"Given to Fly" (McCready, Vedder) – 4:12
"Nothing as It Seems" (Ament) – 6:02
"Grievance" (Vedder) – 3:09
"Light Years" (Gossard, McCready, Vedder) – 4:53
"Daughter" (Abbruzzese, Ament, Gossard, McCready, Vedder) – 7:37
"Lukin" (Vedder) – 1:04
"Wishlist" (Vedder) – 4:02
"Off He Goes" (Vedder) – 5:33
"Better Man" (Vedder) – 4:37
"State of Love and Trust" (Vedder, McCready, Ament) – 3:28

Disc two
"Insignificance" (Vedder) – 4:42
"Rearviewmirror" (Abbruzzese, Ament, Gossard, McCready, Vedder) – 7:24
"Encore Break" – 3:12
"Present Tense" (McCready, Vedder) – 5:54
"Last Exit" (Abbruzzese, Ament, Gossard, McCready, Vedder) – 2:36
"Once" (Vedder, Gossard) – 3:23
"Elderly Woman Behind the Counter in a Small Town" (Abbruzzese, Ament, Gossard, McCready, Vedder) – 4:37
"Leatherman" (Vedder) – 2:33
"Nothingman" (Vedder, Ament) – 4:25
"Porch" (Vedder) – 6:37
"Last Kiss" (Wayne Cochran) – 3:10
"Yellow Ledbetter" (Ament, McCready, Vedder) – 5:46

Personnel
Pearl Jam
Jeff Ament – bass guitar, design concept
Matt Cameron – drums
Stone Gossard – guitars
Mike McCready – guitars
Eddie Vedder – vocals, guitars

Production
John Burton – engineering
Brett Eliason – mixing
Brad Klausen – design and layout

References

Pearl Jam Official Bootlegs
2001 live albums
Epic Records live albums